Păduraru, meaning "forester", is a Romanian surname that may refer to:

 Maria Păduraru, Romanian rower
 Neculai Păduraru, Romanian sculptor and painter
 Peter (Păduraru)
 Simona Păduraru, Romanian swimmer

Romanian-language surnames
Occupational surnames